The 1996–97 Australia Tri-Nation Series (more commonly known as the 1996–97 Carlton and United Series) was a One Day International (ODI) cricket tri-series where Australia played host to Pakistan and West Indies. Australia missed the finals for the first time since the 1979/80 season. Pakistan and West Indies reached the Finals, which Pakistan won 2–0, with West Indies finishing as runners up for the first time.

Squads

Points table

Result summary

Final series
Pakistan won the best of three final series against West Indies 2–0.

External links
 Series home at Cricinfo

References

Australian Tri-Series
1996 in cricket
1997 in cricket
1996–97 Australian cricket season
1996 in Pakistani cricket
1997 in Australian cricket
1997 in Pakistani cricket
1996–97
1996–97
International cricket competitions from 1994–95 to 1997